Hydnum ovoideisporum is a species of fungus in the family Hydnaceae native to the southern Europe.

References

Fungi described in 2012
Fungi of Europe
ovoideisporum